Vincent Richard Impellitteri (born Vincenzo Impellitteri; February 4, 1900 – January 29, 1987) was an American politician and judge who served as the 101st Mayor of New York City, 1950–53. He was elected as a Democrat as president of the City Council in 1945, and reelected in 1949. When Mayor William O'Dwyer resigned in 1950, he became acting mayor. He lost the Democratic primary for the nomination for a full term but was subsequently elected mayor on a new ticket, the "Experience Party". He lost the Democratic primary when he ran for reelection in 1953, and became a judge in 1954.

Early life
Born Vincenzo Impellitteri in Isnello, Sicily, and moved with his family to the United States as an infant in 1901.  They settled in Ansonia, Connecticut, where Impellitteri spent most of his youth.  He was a Catholic.  He enlisted in the United States Navy for World War I and served as a radioman with the rank of petty officer third class on board the destroyer USS Stockton, which was based in Queenstown, Ireland and performed convoy escort and antisubmarine duty.  He left the Navy after the war and became a U.S. citizen in 1922.  Impellitteri attended Fordham Law School, where he received his law degree in 1924. He married Elizabeth (Betty) Agnes McLaughlin in 1926.

Start of career
He served as a state Assistant District Attorney from 1929 to 1938 before becoming a clerk to two Supreme Court Justices, first Peter Schmuck, and later Joseph A. Gavagan. He was reportedly a close associate of gangster Tommy Lucchese, who helped Impellitteri's rise in politics.  On the other hand, a report in the New York World-Telegram indicated that Impelliteri opposed organized crime and corruption, and had failed to rise through the city Democratic Party's ranks because he had "the injudicious good taste to snub Frank Costello", the gambler and racketeer who was said to control the Tammany Hall organization behind the scenes.

In 1945, Mayor William O'Dwyer picked Impellitteri to run for President of the City Council on the Tammany Hall slate. He ran on the Democratic and American Labor Party lines in 1945, but when he was up for reelection in 1949 he ran on the Democratic Party line alone. 

According to historian Robert Caro, Impelliteri was drafted into his first elected role by Democratic Party leadership, who selected his name out of a municipal employee directory. The party was seeking an Italian-American Manhattan resident to bring balance to the citywide ticket, and thought an employee in his position would be easy to persuade on political matters.

Mayor of New York City
On August 31, 1950, O'Dwyer, pursued by both federal and state investigators, was suddenly appointed by President Harry S. Truman as ambassador to Mexico, where he would be beyond the reach of officials who wanted his public testimony in several matters on which he preferred not to speak. Under the City Charter of the day, when O'Dwyer resigned, City Council President Impellitteri became acting mayor. The Tammany bosses did not think he was mayor material, and they refused to nominate him as the Democratic candidate for the special election in November 1950, which instead went to highly regarded New York State Supreme Court Judge Ferdinand Pecora, who was also given the Liberal line. Impellitteri ignored the machine and ran as an independent under the banner of the new "Experience Party". He also popularized the slogan "unbought and unbossed" during his 1950 campaign.

Impellitteri was the first mayor since the consolidation of greater New York in 1898 who was elected without a major party's ballot line, and his election was a populist uprising against the political system. The results were:

 Vincent Impellitteri (Experience Party) 1,161,175 votes
 Ferdinand Pecora (Democratic/Liberal) 935,351
 Edward Corsi (Republican) 382,372
 Paul L. Ross (American Labor) 147,578

Impellitteri's inauguration, held on November 14, 1950, absent either a band or a platform, was both swift and simple. Outside City Hall, he pledged to "do my level best to justify the confidence you have reposed in me."

Shortly after Impellitteri's succession, the Kings County District Attorney arrested bookmaker Harry Gross and launched a corruption investigation that ultimately caused nearly 500 police officers of all ranks to resign, retire, or be fired. Impellitteri opposed the corruption, vigorously supporting the Brooklyn District Attorney, Miles McDonald, and firing anyone in his administration who had been associated with former Mayor William O'Dwyer.

Impellitteri is credited with trying to rein in the budget, raising the bus and subway fare to fifteen cents, establishing parking meters on city streets for enhanced revenue and increasing the sales tax. He aspired to be a new light in city politics, but his administration met with some resistance from the established order. At the time, Robert Moses wielded significant influence; according to Robert Caro (in his Moses biography The Power Broker), Moses provided Impellitteri regular advice and guidance behind the scenes, and Impellitteri deferred to Moses. The mayor's 1950 visit to his birthplace in Sicily was documented by the Italian author Carlo Levi.

Impellitteri ran for a full term in 1953.  He was defeated in the Democratic primary by then Manhattan Borough President Robert F. Wagner, Jr. Although New York City Comptroller Lazarus Joseph usually sided in the New York City Board of Estimate with Impellitteri during the latter's term in office, Joseph supported Wagner for the Democratic nomination.

Later career
After becoming mayor, Wagner appointed Impelliteri a judge of the criminal court.  Impellitteri retired from the bench in 1965.

Philanthropy
Impelliteri became a patron of The Lambs Club in 1949.

Death and burial
He died of Parkinson's disease on January 29, 1987, at Bridgeport Hospital in Bridgeport, Connecticut.  Impellitteri was buried at Mount Saint Peter Catholic Cemetery in Derby, Connecticut.

See also 

 List of mayors of New York City
 List of members of the American Legion

References

Further reading 

 Levi, Carlo. Words are Stones (1958), essay, Part One.
 Lagumina, Salvator. New York at Mid-Century: The Impellitteri Years (1992), scholarly biography; highly favorable
 Moscow, Warren. The last of the big-time bosses: The life and times of Carmine De Sapio and the rise and fall of Tammany Hall (1971), highly negative

External links 

 Mayor Impellitteri's biography on the web site of New York City
 

1900 births
1987 deaths
Fordham University School of Law alumni
Italian emigrants to the United States
Mayors of New York City
Neurological disease deaths in Connecticut
Deaths from Parkinson's disease
New York (state) Democrats
People from Ansonia, Connecticut
People from Connecticut
20th-century American politicians
Catholics from Connecticut
United States Navy personnel of World War I
United States Navy sailors
Members of The Lambs Club
American people of Italian descent